Selles-sur-Cher is a commune in the French department of Loir-et-Cher, administrative region of Centre-Val de Loire, France.

The name of the commune is known internationally for its goat cheese, Selles-sur-Cher, which was first made in the village in the 19th century.

Name
The commune was formerly known as Cellule, then Celle-Saint-Eusice, also spelled Selles-Saint-Eusice, Selles-Notre-Dame, Selles-en-Berry, before changing to Selles-sur-Cher.

Population

See also
Communes of the Loir-et-Cher department

References

Communes of Loir-et-Cher
Berry, France